Kyle K. Lofton (born May 31, 1999) is an American college basketball player for the Florida Gators of the Southeastern Conference (SEC). He previously played for the St. Bonaventure Bonnies.

High school career
Raised in Hillside, New Jersey, Lofton attended Union Catholic Regional High School in Scotch Plains, New Jersey, receiving no NCAA Division I scholarship offers. He played a postgraduate season for Putnam Science Academy in Putnam, Connecticut and helped his team win its first National Prep Championship. He committed to playing college basketball for St. Bonaventure over offers from UMass, Quinnipiac and Robert Morris. He joined the program with his high school teammate Osun Osunniyi.

College career
On February 17, 2019, Lofton recorded a freshman season-high 32 points and seven assists in a 79–56 win over George Mason. Three days later, he scored 18 points, including a game-winning pull-up jump shot with 10.7 remaining, in a 62–60 victory over La Salle. As a freshman, he averaged 14.4 points, 3.7 assists and 2.5 rebounds per game, earning Atlantic 10 All-Rookie and All-Tournament honors. On December 30, Lofton posted a sophomore season-high 32 points, eight assists and five rebounds in an 84–79 loss to Buffalo. As a sophomore, he averaged 14.1 points, six assists and 2.6 rebounds per game and was a First Team All-Atlantic 10 selection. On January 2, 2021, Lofton made a game-winning three-pointer with 2.8 seconds left as part of a 16-point performance in a 69–66 win over Richmond. As a junior, Lofton averaged 14.4 points, 5.5 assists, and 1.4 steals per game. He repeated on the First Team All-Atlantic 10. As a senior, Lofton was named to the Third Team All-Atlantic 10.

On May 13, 2022, Lofton transferred to Florida as a graduate student.

Career statistics

College

|-
| style="text-align:left;"| 2018–19
| style="text-align:left;"| St. Bonaventure
| 34 || 34 || 37.4 || .441 || .330 || .838 || 2.5 || 3.7 || 1.4 || .1 || 14.4
|-
| style="text-align:left;"| 2019–20
| style="text-align:left;"| St. Bonaventure
| 31 || 31 || 38.4 || .422 || .336 || .806 || 2.6 || 6.0 || 1.4 || .1 || 14.1
|-
| style="text-align:left;"| 2020–21
| style="text-align:left;"| St. Bonaventure
| 21 || 21 || 38.4 || .414 || .240 || .813 || 3.5 || 5.5 || 1.4 || .1 || 14.4
|-
| style="text-align:left;"| 2021–22
| style="text-align:left;"| St. Bonaventure
| 30 || 30 || 38.5 || .402 || .282 || .820 || 3.6 || 5.9 || 2.0 || .1 || 12.8
|- class="sortbottom"
| style="text-align:center;" colspan="2"| Career
| 116 || 116 || 38.1 || .421 || .303 || .820 || 3.0 || 5.2 || 1.6 || .1 || 13.9

References

External links
Florida Gators bio
St. Bonaventure Bonnies bio

1999 births
Living people
American men's basketball players
Basketball players from New Jersey
People from Hillside, New Jersey
Point guards
Sportspeople from Union County, New Jersey
St. Bonaventure Bonnies men's basketball players
Union Catholic Regional High School alumni